Arley McNeney Cruthers (born 1983) is a Canadian former Paralympic wheelchair basketball player and applied communications instructor at Kwantlen Polytechnic University. She has won a bronze medal with the Canada women's national wheelchair basketball team at the 2004 Summer Paralympics.

Early life and education
McNeney was born and raised in New Westminster, British Columbia. At the age of 11, she was diagnosed with avascular necrosis and confined to a wheelchair and crutches until she was 27.

McNeney attended the University of Victoria and the University of Illinois at Urbana–Champaign, where she earned her MFA and competed on the Fighting Illini women's varsity wheelchair basketball team.

Career
McNeney joined Canada women's national wheelchair basketball team in 2001, and won gold at the Wheelchair Basketball World Championship the next year. As a result, she was the recipient of BC's Premier Athletic Award for New Westminster. In 2004, McNeney was named to Team Canada's national wheelchair basketball team to compete at the 2004 Summer Paralympics, where she helped them win bronze. Two years later, she was named to Team Canada for the 2006 Wheelchair Basketball World Championship.

In 2008, she was selected to compete at the Osaka Cup. However, she was forced to retire from wheelchair basketball after undergoing hip replacement surgery which allowed her to walk again. In 2014, she received the BC Wheelchair Basketball Society's Coach of the Year award.

While working as a communications instructor at Kwantlen Polytechnic University, McNeney and her husband Chris Cruthers began conducting workshops for disabled individuals regarding online dating.

Author
In 2007, she wrote a book on her experience with the Canadian women's wheelchair basketball team and her retirement, which was shortlisted for the Commonwealth Foundation prizes. A few years later, she wrote her second book called "The Time We All Went Marching," based on memoirs from her grandmother.

References

External links
Paralympic profile

Living people
1983 births
20th-century Canadian women
21st-century Canadian women
Canadian women non-fiction writers
Illinois Fighting Illini women's basketball players
Canadian women's wheelchair basketball players
Paralympic wheelchair basketball players of Canada
Paralympic bronze medalists for Canada
Medalists at the 2004 Summer Paralympics
Sportspeople from New Westminster
Paralympic medalists in wheelchair basketball
Wheelchair basketball players at the 2004 Summer Paralympics